A Banquet for Hungry Ghosts: A collection of Deliciously Frightening Tales is a young adult fiction book written by Ying Chang Compestine. Set in China, the book blends Chinese culture, cuisine, and modern customs into eight horror stories.[1][2]

Plot summary 
The tales in A Banquet for Hungry Ghosts spans across China, ranging from 200 BC to the modern technological world. In Chinese legends, people who die hungry return as vengeful ghosts to haunt the living. Some of these ghosts can be calmed with food, but others have more malicious desires. In addition to focusing on the cuisine and ghosts stories of Chinese culture, each tale has socially conscious undertones which explore the abuse of power and class disparity across China. Each ghost acts as a champion for the poor and powerless people, helping them obtain justice.

The book is organized as a Chinese menu. From appetizers and main courses to desserts, every story ends with an authors note and a recipe based on the story.

The Appetizers

Steamed Dumplings 
Jiang, a greedy businessman, opens up a haunted inn and skimps out on the ingredients in his dumplings. The events that follow are less than savory.

Tea Eggs 
After a tragic accident at the fireworks factory in Yun's school, many people are affected, but none more than the undertakers of the "room of the dead". After all, hungry ghosts rarely stay dead.

The Main Courses

Beef Stew 
After an accident at work, Chou is left to eat his favorite meal while he awaits capital punishment. Meanwhile, the rich and powerful have other plans instore for him.

Tofu with Chili-Garlic Sauce 
Dr. Zhou, one of the best surgeons in China, is haunted by a deceased patient after eating a lavish banquet.

Long-Life Noodles 
Master Ma's disappearance is shrouded in mystery until his successor, Master Chen, eats long-life noodles, flavored with the exotic shiitake mushrooms. Something tragic happens.

Egg Stir-Fried Rice 
Madame Peng gives the phrase "evil stepmother" a whole new meaning and the dead take notice.

The Desserts

Jasmine Almond Cookies 
The Lee family names their three boys after the best dishes served at their restaurant. After their oldest son dies, they take offerings to his grave. But some strange things happen to the offering at the graveyard.

Eight-Treasure Rice Pudding 
Wei is furious when his father kills his pet praying mantis. He thinks the death of his father will set him free, but the consequences are worse than he imagined.

Character List

Appetizers

Steamed Dumplings 
 Mu- previous innkeeper of the Double Happy
 Fur Hat- worker on the Great Wall of China
 Cotton Jacket- worker on the Great Wall of China
 Jiang- modern day successful businessman from Beijing
 Uncle- Jiang's uncle
 Dave- American students tourist
 Chef- cook at the new Double Happy Inn

Tea Eggs 
 Yun- protagonist, middle school student
 Ming- Yun's friend
 Gui- Yun's friend
 Bo- Yun's friend
 Mother- Yun's mother
 Father- Yun's father
 Principal
 Miàn Tiáo (Noodle)- Undertaker
 Dōng Guā (Melon)- Undertaker

Main Courses

Beef Stew 
 Chou- protagonist
 Broken Faucet- Chou's employer
 Female Officer- medical examiner
 Li Zen- judge
 Chief Lo- police chief

Tofu with Chili-Garlic Sauce 
 Dr. Zhou- protagonist, surgeon
 Shao Ren- patient of Dr. Zhou
 Mr. Ren- father of Shao Ren
 Mrs. Ren- mother of Shao Ren
 Dr. Zan- Dr. Zhou's assistant
 City Mayor
 Mr. Lin- Mayor's assistant
 Long Legs- waitress
 Officer Wang- police officer

Long-Life Noodles 
 Master Ma- old head monk at Wu Jing Temple
 Master Chen- new head monk at Wu Jing Temple
 Cong- youngest monk at Wu Jing Temple
 Master Lung- monk at Wu Jing Temple, chef
 Chief Xiong- police chief

Egg Stir-Fried Rice 
 Fong- protagonist
 Madame Peng- antagonist, Fong's stepmother
 Mr. Yue- Fong's father
 Housekeeper Ting

Desserts

Jasmine Almond Cookies 
 Almond Cookie Lee- oldest son
 Barbecue Ribs Lee- middle son
 Drumsticks in Curry Sauce Lee- youngest son
 Mr. Lee- parent, restaurateur
 Mrs. Lee- parent, restaurateur
 Mrs. Qian- friend of Lees, hair salon owner
 Mr. Zong- frequent customer at Lees' restaurant

Eight-Treasure Rice Pudding 
 Wei- protagonist
 Master Shi- Wei's father
 Tutor- Wei's tutor
 Cai- Wei's friend
 Ban- Wei's friend
 Liang- Wei's friend

Television adaptation 
In October 2021, it was reported that 108 Media would be adapting the book into an animated television series with Tricia Lee as writer.

Critical reception 
A Banquet for Hungry Ghosts has received good reviews from readers and other literary organizations such as Publishers Weekly, School Library Journal, Booklist, The Horn Book Magazine, and Kirkus Reviews.

Awards 
 Notable Book for 2010 by the Children's Literary Assembly
 AARP Grandparent's Book for Children

References 

Short stories set in China
Horror short story collections
Chinese folklore
2016 short story collections
Works by Ying Chang Compestine
Young adult short story collections